Dragon Ball Z: Broly – The Legendary Super Saiyan, known in Japan as  or by Toei's own English title Dragon Ball Z: The Burning Battles, is a 1993 Japanese anime science fiction martial arts film and the eighth Dragon Ball Z feature film. The original release date in Japan was on March 6, 1993 at the Toei Anime Fair alongside Dr. Slump and Arale-chan: N-cha! Clear Skies Over Penguin Village. It was dubbed into English and released by Funimation in 2003.

The antagonist Broly was created by Takao Koyama and was designed by series creator Akira Toriyama. This film is the first of three titular films featuring the character, followed by Broly – Second Coming and Bio-Broly in 1994. The character also appeared in Dragon Ball Z: The Real 4-D at Super Tenkaichi Budokai, a cinematic attraction at Universal Studios Japan in 2017.

In 2018, a reboot film titled Dragon Ball Super: Broly was released and served as a retelling of Broly's origins and character arc, taking place after the conclusion of the Dragon Ball Super anime.

Plot

King Kai senses the destruction of the south galaxy by a Super Saiyan and realizes that the north galaxy will be targeted next. He telepathically contacts Goku who begins tracking the Super Saiyan's energy.

On Earth, a spaceship interrupts a picnic and army of humanoid alien soldiers greet Vegeta as their king. Their leader is revealed to be Saiyan named Paragus who claims that he has created a New Planet Vegeta and wishes for Vegeta to assume the Saiyan throne. Vegeta agrees after Paragus tells him that the "Legendary Super Saiyan" is running rampant throughout the galaxy and must be stopped. Gohan, Future Trunks, Krillin, Master Roshi, and Oolong accompany Vegeta onto the ship.

On New Vegeta, Vegeta meets Paragus' son, Broly, who joins him in tracking the Super Saiyan on other planets. Gohan, Trunks, and Krillin explore New Vegeta and discover that it is uninhabited except for the alien slaves who reveal that a Super Saiyan obliterated their civilization. The slave masters begin to abuse them but they are defended by Gohan and Krillin. Goku arrives and is greeted by Paragus, who invites them to dinner at the palace. Broly appears agitated at the mere sight of Goku. Paragus calms his son by using a device on his bracelet that syncs to Broly's headband. Despite this, Broly attacks Goku in the middle of the night requiring Paragus to calm his son once again. Goku suspects that Broly is a Super Saiyan and Paragus contemplates the mind-control device and suspects that it is malfunctioning due to Broly responding aggressively to Goku. Paragus theorizes that Broly's violent Saiyan instincts are awakening as a result of Goku's power, then remembers they were born on the same day in an attempt to explain their fated encounter after all these years.

Goku and the others confront Paragus upon learning the truth about Broly as his aggression toward Goku swells to the point of breaking free of the mind control device and he finally transforms into a rage filled behemoth - the Legendary Super Saiyan. Broly attacks Goku who is defended by Trunks and Gohan while a fearful Vegeta loses his will to fight. Paragus taunts Vegeta while revealing that Broly was born with a power level of 10,000 and was feared by King Vegeta to the point that he ordered the infant's execution. Paragus failed to persuade King Vegeta to spare Broly, who was pierced in the abdomen by a knife and left for dead with his father, while Frieza destroyed the planet that same day. Broly's survival instincts caused him to shield himself and Paragus and they soared off into space protected by Broly's power. Broly grew unstable and sadistic as he aged, and Paragus was forced to use a mind-control device to pacify his son, but planned to use him to exact his revenge on King Vegeta's bloodline, and convert the Earth into new Planet Vegeta. Paragus reveals that a comet is currently on approach toward New Vegeta, and will destroy it upon impact.

Goku, Gohan, and Trunks are dominated by Broly until Piccolo arrives and heals them with Senzu beans. They engage Broly again, but continue to be severely outmatched. After being scolded by Piccolo, Vegeta's pride returns and he confronts Broly but is quickly incapacitated. Paragus prepares to escape the doomed planet in a small space pod before he is confronted by Broly and killed. Despite Broly's power continuing to increase, Goku manages to challenge him yet again and he is mercilessly beaten as he asks his allies to lend him their energy. After much reluctance, Vegeta finally gives Goku his energy who is able to use it to strike a piercing blow into Broly, causing the Legendary Super Saiyan's power to become unstable and he explodes.

Just as the comet strikes and destroys New Vegeta, Goku, his allies, and the slaves cheer as they manage to escape in Piccolo's spaceship.

Cast

Music
OP (Opening Theme):
 "Cha-La Head-Cha-La"
 Lyrics by Yukinojō Mori
 Music by Chiho Kiyooka
 Arranged by Kenji Yamamoto
 Performed by Hironobu Kageyama
ED (Ending Theme):
 
 Lyrics by Dai Satō
 Music by Chiho Kiyooka
 Arranged by Kenji Yamamoto
 Performed by Hironobu Kageyama and Yuka

English dub soundtrack
The following songs were present in the Funimation dub of Dragon Ball Z: Broly – The Legendary Super Saiyan: The remaining pieces of background music were composed by Mark Menza.

 Tendril - Eternal Sacrifice (Opening Theme of Film)
 El Gato - Lost in America (Part 1)
 Brave Combo - Dance of the Hours (Part 1 & 2)
 Pointy Shoe Factory - On Your Knees
 Pointy Shoe Factory - Bump in the Night
 Doosu - Louisiana House Fire. Mid 1950
 The Aleph - Lazarus
 Slow Roosevelt - Boys Lie, Girls Steal
 Spoonfed Tribe - Beetle Orange
 Dokodemo Doa - Fearful Yet Hopeful
 Pointy Shoe Factory - The Dub and the Dead
 Pantera - 10's
 Tendril - Invisibles
 Gravity Pool - Reach
 Gravity Pool - Won't Give In
 Haji's Kitchen - Day After Day
 Slow Roosevelt - Silverback
 Haji's Kitchen - Lost
 El Gato - Stained-Glass Windshield

The Triple Feature release contains an alternate audio track containing the English dub with original Japanese background music by Shunsuke Kikuchi, an opening theme of "Cha-La Head-Cha-La", and an ending theme of "Burning Fight —A Close, Intense, Super-Fierce Battle—".

Box office
In Japan, the film sold  tickets and grossed .

On September 15 and 17, 2018, the film had a limited theatrical release by Fathom Events in the United States due to the upcoming release of Dragon Ball Super: Broly (2018). According to Box Office Mojo, as of September 19, 2018, it made a revenue of $658,982.

Releases
In Japan, the home video release sold 40,000 units by 1996.

It was released on DVD and VHS in North America on August 26, 2003. Plus, it was released it in a bundle along with Broly – Second Coming (1994) for Blu-ray on November 13, 2007, both feature full 1080p format in HD remastered 16:9 aspect ratio and an enhanced 5.1 surround mix. It was later released in Triple Feature set with the original Broly films and Bio-Broly (1994) for Blu-ray and DVD on March 31, 2009. The film was re-released to DVD in remastered thinpak collection on December 6, 2011, containing the second 4 Dragon Ball Z films.

Other companies
A third English dub produced and released exclusively in Malaysia by Speedy Video features an unknown voice cast.

References

External links
 Official anime website of Toei Animation
 
 
 
 

1993 films
1993 anime films
Broly The Legendary Super Saiyan
Funimation
Fiction about mind control
Patricide in fiction
Toei Animation films
Films scored by Shunsuke Kikuchi
Films set on fictional planets
Toonami